Stigmatisphaera is a genus of fungi in the Ascomycota phylum. The relationship of this taxon to other taxa within the class is unknown (incertae sedis), and it has not yet been placed with certainty into any class, order, or family.

See also
 List of Ascomycota genera incertae sedis

References

Ascomycota enigmatic taxa
Taxa named by Barthélemy Charles Joseph Dumortier